Berendsen is a Dutch patronymic surname. It is most common in southeast Gelderland. The given name Berend, like Barend, is a form of the name Bernhard.

Carl Berendsen (1890–1973), New Zealand civil servant and diplomat
Dan Berendsen (born 1964), American producer and screenwriter
Herman Berendsen (1934–2019), Dutch chemist after whom the Berendsen thermostat was named
Til Gardeniers-Berendsen (1925–2019), Dutch Government Minister

References

Surnames from given names
Dutch-language surnames
Patronymic surnames